USS West Gate (ID-3216) was a cargo ship for the United States Navy during World War I. The ship was laid down as SS War Agate, but she was launched in January 1918 as SS West Gate instead.

SS West Gate was one of the steam-powered West boats that were built for the United States Shipping Board (USSB). They were steel-hulled cargo ships built on the West Coast of the United States for the World War I war effort. She was the 3rd ship built by the Columbia River Shipbuilding Company in Portland, Oregon. She was commissioned into the Naval Overseas Transportation Service (NOTS) of the United States Navy in April 1918.

After experiencing engine trouble on her first attempt at a transatlantic crossing, West Gate was unsuccessfully attacked by two German submarines in early July 1918 while returning to port for repairs. After successfully completing her trip to France, she began her second transatlantic trip in early October. Seven men lost their lives in the accident.

Design and construction 
The ship was laid down at the Columbia River Shipbuilding Company of Portland, Oregon under the name War Agate as part of an order for the British Admiralty. Had she been sold to them, the War Agate would have been operated by the Cunard Line. However, the USSB commandeered and received title to all private shipbuilding projects in progress in mid-1917, which included the still-incomplete War Agate. The ship was renamed West Gate by the time of her launching on 27 January 1918. She was one of the West ships, which were cargo ships of similar size and design built by several shipyards on the West Coast of the United States for the USSB for emergency use during the First World War. All of the West ships were given names that began with the word West, and West Gate was the 3rd of some 30 West ships built at Columbia River Shipbuilding.

Career 
After her April 1918 completion,  West Gate was handed over to the United States Navy for use in the NOTS. She was commissioned at Norfolk, Virginia, as USS West Gate (ID-3216) the same day.

After making her way to New York, West Gate took on 6,700 tons of cargo that included locomotives, steel rails, and other materiel for the United States Army and departed in a convoy for France on 28 June. The ship soon developed engine trouble and dropped out of the convoy to head to St. John's, Newfoundland, for repairs. While headed to St. John's in moderate seas under a cloudy sky, West Gate was attacked by two German submarines at 19:15 on 3 July. One U-boat surfaced in front of the cargo ship, crossing to starboard. As West Gate quickly turned to port to evade the U-boat, a second U-boat surfaced one point to starboard. While West Gates radio operator sent out a preemptive SOS, her gunners opened fire on the two submarines. Though her gunners made hits on neither boat, both were bracketed with fire, quickly submerged, and apparently departed the scene. West Gate arrived at St. John's at 18:00 on 7 July without any further contact with enemy vessels.

After four days of repairs, West Gate departed St. John's for France and arrived at the Gironde estuary on 22 July. She shifted to Saint-Nazaire three days later where she unloaded her cargo. West Gate departed on 21 August for Newport News, Virginia, where she arrived on 10 September. Later in the month, she headed to New York for major engine repairs.

Final voyage 

On the night of 6/7 October—noted in the Dictionary of American Naval Fighting Ships as "particularly dark and rainy"—the ships were having trouble maintaining their stations in the convoy. West Gate was sailing in the first column to the starboard of the guide ship, .

The crew put the ship's engines at half speed to try to drop out of the convoy. Lieutenant Spencer, the chief engineer, and his assistant, Lieutenant (j.g.) Hillery, headed to the machinery spaces to see about effecting repairs. At 02:30, men on the bridge sighted the red light from the oncoming , which had been steaming behind and to the port of West Gate. Though the bridge ordered the engines raised to "full speed ahead" to avoid the collision, there was no time for the engines to respond before Americans bow cut into the starboard side of West Gate, near the poop deck.

West Gates engines were shut down while American backed out of the tangle. West Gate quickly began to settle and the order to abandon ship was issued. The chief engineer and his assistant, Spencer and Hillery, remained belowdecks long enough to extinguish the boilers and open safety valves to prevent the explosion of the boilers. They finished the task just before the aft bulkhead gave way to the inrushing seawater. Both arrived on deck in time to board lifeboat number 2, which had been held as long as possible for men in the after part of the ship.

Chief Gunner's Mate Michael B. Wallrath, who had assisted in lowering three lifeboats while he remained on board, jumped overboard after seeing to it that all the boats were away. Wallrath was pulled into lifeboat number 6 just before a wave capsized it and drowned two of its occupants. Lieutenant commander R. B. Vandervoort, USNRF, West Gates commanding officer, remained on board until he felt sure that the entire crew had departed the sinking ship. When he climbed up on the deckhouse to cut free a life raft and leave the ship, he discovered six men huddled on deck. Vandervoort was able to get the six on the life raft, but the suction caused by West Gates final plunge pulled him away and below the surface. After he managed to get back to the surface, he clung to floating wreckage for two hours until pulled aboard the very raft he had missed earlier. Vandervoort and the six men aboard the raft were rescued by one of Americans lifeboats at 06:00, after some 3½ hours in the water.

A total of seven men from West Gate, two from lifeboat six and five others probably killed in the initial collision, lost their lives in the accident. The U.S. Navy awarded Chief Gunner's Mate Wallrath a Letter of Commendation for his actions during the sinking of West Gate.

Notes

References

Bibliography 

 
 
 
 

Steamships of the United States
Cargo ships of the United States Navy
Ships built in Portland, Oregon
Standard World War I ships
World War I auxiliary ships of the United States
World War I shipwrecks in the Atlantic Ocean
1918 ships
Maritime incidents in 1918
Ships sunk in collisions